The Rallye Paris – Saint-Raphaël Féminin was a car rally in France exclusively for female participants. It was held over a 45-year period beginning in 1929 with a hiatus during World War II.

History 
In 1929, Count Edmé de Rohan-Chabot (28 December 1904 – 5 October 1972, chevalier of the Legion of Honor) created this race. Racers at its first running included the Countess de Lesguern and the Baroness d'Elern.

While there had been other such races, including the Rallye Paris–La Baule pour dames and the Championnat féminin de l’Auto sponsored by the Automobile Club Féminin de France established by the Duchesse d'Uzès in 1927, these eventually ended, leaving the Rallye Paris – Saint-Raphaël the world's only major automobile race reserved for women during the middle part of the 20th century.

The rally consisted of special performance tests, pure navigation sections, and driving tests, with end-points in the cities of Paris and Saint-Raphaël.

The race was won by Madame Liétard in a Salmson AL7 GS.

The second rally of 19 February 1930 went Paris–Vichy–Hyères–St-Raphaël, and covered . By this time the race had already acquired a certain fame. Maurice Philippe became director of the event during the 1930s.

In 1932, Frenchwoman Renée Friderich, daughter of driver Ernest Friderich, died in an accident with her Delage D8. The only other deaths during the event's history were Cathy Pitt, who was killed in 1969 in a head-on collision on a road section, and Marguerite Accarie who died during the 1970 event during the final special stage.

Englishwoman Betty Haig, grand-niece of Marshal Douglas Haig, won the race in 1938. Two years earlier, as the only female competitor, she won the 1936 Olympic Rally in a Singer Le Mans 1500 in the only road-going motorized Olympic demonstration event (powerboating appearing in 1908) never accepted by the IOC. In 1946 she also won the first Coupe des Dames awarded in the post-war period at the revived Coupe des Alpes rally.

In 1972 Count de Rohan-Chabot died, marking the beginning of the decline of the race. Points earned in the 1973 season, still exclusively for female drivers, were counted towards the European Rally Championship (ERC). In 1974 Belgian Christine Beckers won the last Paris – Saint-Raphaël of its 45-year history at the wheel of a Lancia Stratos. This final event was also recognized by the ERC. It also marked the first appearance of Michèle Mouton in a national competition as a driver.

A spiritual successor to the Rallye Paris – Saint-Raphaël Féminin appeared 26 years later with the first running of the Rallye des Princesses in the year 2000.

Winners

Driver gallery

Race gallery

References 

Recurring sporting events established in 1929
Women's sport in France